was a Japanese novelist, short-story writer and essayist during the late Meiji and Taishō periods. His son was the internationally known film and stage actor, Masayuki Mori.

Early life
Arishima was born in Tokyo, Japan into a wealthy family as the son of an ex-samurai official in the Ministry of Finance. He was first sent to a mission school in Yokohama, where he was taught English, after which he entered preparatory school of the prestigious Gakushuin peer's school, when he was 10 years old.

After he graduated from the Gakushuin at age 19, he entered the Sapporo Agricultural College (the present-day Faculty of Agriculture at Hokkaido University). The suicide failed, and Arishima subsequently became influenced by Uchimura Kanzō and became a Christian in 1901. Morimoto later went on to establish several women's schools around Japan.

After graduation and a mandatory short stint in the Imperial Japanese Army, Arishima took English lessons from Mary Elkinton Nitobe, Inazo Nitobe's wife, and in July 1903, he obtained a position as a foreign correspondent in the United States for the Mainichi Shimbun. In the United States he enrolled at Haverford College (a Quaker institution outside of Philadelphia) and later Harvard University. After graduation, he briefly worked in an insane asylum operated by the Quaker sect.  He recorded his experiences from his journey to America in his diary.

During his time in America, he became critical towards Christianity, attracted to socialism, and influenced by the works of writers such as Walt Whitman, Henrik Ibsen, and Peter Kropotkin. His time and experiences in America and subsequent year in Europe also profoundly influenced his writing style and his outlook on the world, resulting in feelings of alienation from Japanese society.

After he returned to Japan in 1907, he re-entered the army briefly before becoming an English and ethics teacher in 1909 at his alma mater.

Literary career
Through his brother Arishima Ikuma, he also became acquainted with authors who graduated from the Gakushuin, including Naoya Shiga and Saneatsu Mushanokōji.  Arishima and these writers formed a group, which was named after their literary magazine {{nihongo|Shirakaba|白樺|White Birch}}, which was first published in 1911. He wrote novels and literary criticisms and was known as one of the central figures in the Shirakaba group.

In 1919 he published his best-known work: , a moral and psychological melodrama about a strong-willed woman struggling against a hypocritical male-dominated society. While critically acclaimed for his style, the themes and characters of Arishima’s works did not appeal to many contemporary Japanese readers.

Later life
In 1922, Arishima implemented the socialist philosophy he had been developing by renunciation of the ownership of a large tenant farm in Hokkaidō, which he had inherited from his father, publicly stating that he wanted to distance himself from the petit bourgeois in the coming revolution.

Arishima married in 1910, but his wife died in 1916 of tuberculosis leaving him three children. In 1922, Arishima met Akiko Hatano, a married woman and an editor working for the Fujin Koron, a famous women's magazine. Their relationship quickly developed into an extramarital affair, which came to be known by Hatano's husband.  This led to Arishima and Hatano committing suicide in Karuizawa by hanging themselves. Due to the isolated location, their bodies were not discovered for over a month, and were identified largely by the suicide note left behind. Arishima's grave is at the Tama Cemetery in Tokyo.

Legacy
After his death, Arishima became known for his detailed diaries, covering more than twenty volumes, with an intimate record of his life, fears and hopes. His contemporaries regarded Arishima as a philosopher and social critic as much as a novelist. His writing was critical of Christianity and strongly influenced by socialism; emotionally intense, humanistic, and employed ideas from the Bible, Tolstoy, and anarchic socialism.

Arishima's major works include:
  1919
 , 1917

Available in English
 A Certain Woman, transl. by Kenneth Strong, University of Tokyo Press, 1978, 382 pages, .
 Labyrinth. Madison Books (2000). 
 The Descendants of Cain, transl. by John Morrison, University of Utah Press, 1955. 
 The Agony of Coming Into the World. Hokuseido Press (1955). ASIN: B0006AV8GE
 Death (A Play), transl. by Yozan Iwasaki and Glenn Hughes, D. Appleton and Company, NY, 1930.

References

 Anderer, Paul. Other Worlds: Arishima Takeo and the Bounds of Modern Japanese Fiction. Columbia University Press (1985). 
 Morton, Leith. Divided Self: A Biography of Arishima Takeo. Harry Ransom Humanities Research Center (1989).

External links
 Arishima Takeo page at Aozora Bunko
 
 Arishima Takeo Memorial Museum in Niseko, Hokkaido 
 
 

1878 births
1923 suicides
Japanese writers
Japanese Christians
Shirakaba-ha
People from Tokyo
Haverford College alumni
Harvard University alumni
Suicides by hanging in Japan
People of Meiji-period Japan
Tolstoyans
Joint suicides
Imperial Japanese Army personnel
Critics of Christianity
Japanese socialists